The 1991 Newsweek Champions Cup and the Virginia Slims of Palm Springs were tennis tournaments played on outdoor hard courts. It was the 18th edition of the tournament, and was part of the ATP Super 9 of the 1991 ATP Tour, and of the Tier II Series of the 1991 WTA Tour. It was held from March 2 through March 16, 1991.

In the men's tournament, Jim Courier won both the singles and doubles tournaments, partnering Javier Sánchez in the latter. This is the first time ever that a male player achieved both titles at the same year.

Champions

Men's singles

 Jim Courier def.  Guy Forget, 4–6, 6–3, 4–6, 6–3, 7–6(7–4)
It was Jim Courier's 1st title of the year and his 2nd overall. It was his 1st Masters title.

Women's singles

 Martina Navratilova def.  Monica Seles 6–2, 7–6(8–6)
It was Martina Navratilova's 2nd title of the year and her 154th overall.

Men's doubles

 Jim Courier /  Javier Sánchez def.  Guy Forget /  Henri Leconte 7–6, 3–6, 6–3

Women's doubles

The women's doubles final was not played due to rain.

References

External links
 
 Association of Tennis Professionals (ATP) tournament profile

 
1991 Newsweek Champions Cup And The Virginia Slims Of Palm Springs
Newsweek Champions Cup
Virginia Slims Of Palm Springs
Newsweek Champions Cup And The Virginia Slims Of Palm Springs
Newsweek Champions Cup And The Virginia Slims Of Palm Springs
Newsweek Champions Cup And The Virginia Slims Of Palm Springs